El Florián is a town and municipality in the Santander Department in northeastern Colombia founded by the Pardo family.

Municipalities of Santander Department